Hackman is an English surname of German origin (German: Hackmann). Notable people of the name include the following:

 Alfred Hackman (1811–1874), English librarian
 Barbara Franklin (née Hackman; b. 1940), U.S. Secretary of Commerce
 Gene Hackman (b. 1930), American actor
 James Hackman (1752–1779), English murderer
 Joseph "Buddy" Hackman (1906–1987), American multi-sport player and coach
 Kevin Hackman, ring name of professional wrestler Andy Leavine
 Luther Hackman (b. 1974), American baseball player
 Marika Hackman (b. 1992), English musician
 Paul Hackman (1952–1992), Canadian guitarist
 Robert Hackman (b. 1941), Ghanaian steeplechase runner 

English-language surnames